Sylvanus Mulford House, also known as John Lyons House, is a historic home located at Montrose, Susquehanna County, Pennsylvania, USA. It was built in 1818 and is a two-story, frame Saltbox style dwelling on a stone foundation, measuring 40 feet by 47 feet. It has a full-width front porch supported by four large columns. Connected to the house is a two-story, frame barn built in 1856.

It was added to the National Register of Historic Places in 1978.

References

External links

Houses on the National Register of Historic Places in Pennsylvania
Historic American Buildings Survey in Pennsylvania
Saltbox architecture in the United States
Houses completed in 1818
1818 establishments in Pennsylvania
National Register of Historic Places in Susquehanna County, Pennsylvania